Xiang'an railway station is a not-yet-constructed railway station planned to be located in the Xiang'an District of Xiamen City, Fujian Province, China, on the Fuzhou-Xiamen Railway operated by the Nanchang Railway Bureau, China Railway Corporation.

Construction
Currently the station has not been constructed but conditions for construction have been reserved.

References 

Railway stations in Fujian